Wacław Michał Kuchar (16 September 1897 – 13 February 1981) was a Polish sports champion, olympian, and multiple football, track and field and speed skating champion of the country.

Kuchar excelled in many sports – track and field, football (firstly – as a forward, then as a midfielder, and finally at the end of his career – as a defender), skiing, speed skating and ice hockey. Even though born in Łańcut, his whole life was connected with Lwów, where he played for Pogoń Lwów – one of the most important and most popular sports clubs of interwar Poland. After finishing his career, he became a referee, coach and sports official. To this day Kuchar is regarded as an excellent example of fair play.

In 1926, in a poll held by the Polish sports daily Przegląd Sportowy, Kuchar was chosen as the athlete of the year. A year later he came in 10th in the same poll. In 1924, at the Paris Olympic Games, he played on the Poland national football team.

Club career 
As a fifteen year old Kuchar made his debut for Pogoń Lwów, however he was neve meant to play in this match. Before the game, several players fell ill, so the coach decided to play young Kuchar. To the coaches surprise, Kuchar scored a hat-trick as Pogoń Lwów won 7-1 against Pogon Stryj. When Kuchar was sixteen, him and his three brothers played a match against Cracovia II Kraków, winning 3-1 with Wacław scoring twice. Their parents were so proud of their sons all playing in the same game.

As a footballer representing Pogoń Lwów, Kuchar achieved these successes:
 years of career – 1912–1935,
 Champion of Poland: 1922, 1923, 1925, 1926,
 top scorer of Poland: 1922 (21 goals), 1926 (11 goals),
 In 1923 he scored 88 goals in unofficial games,
 9 goals in a match against Rewera, 
 4 goals in 5 minutes in a match against WKS Lublin, 
 altogether he played in 1052 games, scoring 1065 goals.

International career 
On the Poland national football team he achieved:
 23 official international games
 5 goals
 debut – 18 February 1921, Hungary – Poland 1–0 (it was the first, historic game of the Polish team)
 last game: 27 October 1928, Czechoslovakia – Poland 3–2
21 unofficial international games
32 goals
 Trainer of Polish National Team 1947–1949.

Athletics 
Wacław Kuchar was champion of Poland in:
 800-meter race (1920, 1921),
 110-meter hurdle race (1920),
 400-meter hurdle race (1923),
 high jump (1921, 1923),
 pentathlon (1923, 1924).

Ice-skating 
Kuchar as an ice skater:
 participated in the European Speed Skating Championships for Men of 1925,
 22-time Champion of Poland (Including single-distance titles) in the period 1922–1929.

Military 
Kuchar is most famous for his sports achievements, but also he was a captain in the Polish Army. He participated in the Polish-Ukrainian War of 1919 as well as the Polish-Soviet War of 1920; for his merits Kuchar was decorated with several medals.

See also 
 Pogoń Lwów
 Polish-Ukrainian War
 Polish-Soviet War
 List of famous Leopolitans
 History of football in Poland

References

External links 
 

1897 births
1981 deaths
People from the Kingdom of Galicia and Lodomeria
Sportspeople from Podkarpackie Voivodeship
Association football defenders
Association football midfielders
Association football forwards
FC Dynamo Lviv managers
Footballers at the 1924 Summer Olympics
Olympic footballers of Poland
Legia Warsaw managers
People from Łańcut
Pogoń Lwów players
Poland national football team managers
Polish expatriate football managers
Polish football managers
Polish footballers
Polish ice hockey players
Polish male high jumpers
Polish male hurdlers
Polish male middle-distance runners
Polish male speed skaters
Polish military personnel
Polish people of the Polish–Soviet War
Polish people of the Polish–Ukrainian War
Polonia Bytom managers
Polonia Warsaw managers
Polish Austro-Hungarians
Poland international footballers